HMS Wheatland was a Type 2  of the Royal Navy that served in the Second World War.

Construction

Wheatland was ordered from Yarrow Shipbuilders, Scotstoun on 4 September 1939, one of 17 Hunt-class destroyers ordered on that day as part of the 1939 Emergency War Programme. The ship was  laid down on 30 May 1940 and was launched on 7 June 1941, commissioning (with the pennant number L122) on 3 November 1941.  She was named after "The Wheatland Hunt", an annual fox hunt held in Shropshire. During Warship Week in 1942 she was adopted by the town of Uttoxeter.

Wartime service

On completion in 1941 Wheatland was sent to Scapa Flow as part of the Naval Force to undertake the Commando raid on the Lofoten Islands. The following year she took part in escort duties in support of the Russian Convoys. In 1943 she served in the Mediterranean, including support for the Sicily landings in July of that year. This included shore bombardment of Taormina on Sicily.

In 1944 she continued operations in the Mediterranean on convoy duties, including in July 1944 being nominated for escort duties in the planned landings in the south of France.

Post war
After the war Wheatland returned to Devonport and transferred to the Reserve Fleet. She stayed there until 1953 when she was towed to Gibraltar where she remained in reserve. In 1955 she was brought back to Harwich before being placed on the disposal list. She remained there until September 1957 when she was sold to BISCO for scrapping by McLennan. She arrived at their breakers yard in Bo'ness on 20 September 1957.

References

Publications
 
 

 

Hunt-class destroyers of the Royal Navy
1941 ships